The 2015 Barcelona Open Banc Sabadell (also known as the Torneo Godó) was a men's tennis tournament played on outdoor clay courts. It was the 63rd edition of the event and part of the ATP World Tour 500 series of the 2015 ATP World Tour. It took place at the Real Club de Tenis Barcelona in Barcelona, Catalonia, Spain, from April 20 through April 26, 2015.

Points and prize money

Points distribution

Prize money

Singles main-draw entrants

Seeds

1 Rankings as of April 13, 2015.

Other entrants
The following players received wildcards into the main draw:
  Roberto Carballés Baena
  Nick Kyrgios
  Albert Montañés
  Elias Ymer

The following players received entry from the qualifying draw:
  Thiemo de Bakker
  Márton Fucsovics
  Jaume Munar
  Andrey Rublev
  Yūichi Sugita
  James Ward

The following player received entry as a lucky loser:
  Kenny de Schepper

Withdrawals
Before the tournament
  Alexandr Dolgopolov →replaced by Kenny de Schepper
  Richard Gasquet →replaced by Andrey Kuznetsov
  Jerzy Janowicz →replaced by Benoît Paire
  Vasek Pospisil →replaced by Teymuraz Gabashvili
  Milos Raonic →replaced by Thomaz Bellucci

Retirements
  Paolo Lorenzi

Doubles main-draw entrants

Seeds

 Rankings are as of April 13, 2015.

Other entrants
The following pairs received wildcards into the doubles main draw:
  Gerard Granollers /  Oriol Roca Batalla
  Albert Montañés /  Albert Ramos Viñolas

The following pair received entry from the qualifying draw:
  Rameez Junaid /  Adil Shamasdin

Champions

Singles

  Kei Nishikori def.  Pablo Andújar, 6−4, 6−4

Doubles

  Marin Draganja /  Henri Kontinen def.  Jamie Murray /  John Peers, 6–3, 6–7(6–8), [11–9]

References

External links
Official website

Barcelona Open Banc Sabadell
Barcelona Open (tennis)
Barcelona Open Banco Sabadell